Partyball is the third album by Stan Ridgway, released in 1991.

Critical reception
Trouser Press wrote that the album "serves up odes to trigger-happy cops, hopeless love, Harry Truman and the atom bomb, otherworldly chain gangs and plague-ridden dystopias, interrupted by odd instrumental interludes that continue Ridgway’s fascination with soundtrack music for invisible movies." The Los Angeles Times called the songs "mainly about the fearsome distortions that come from dominance, power and an unwillingness to acknowledge weakness and vulnerability as our common human lot."

Track listing
All tracks composed by Stan Ridgway
 "Watch Your Step/Jack Talked (Like a Man on Fire)" - 4:19  	
 "I Wanna Be a Boss" - 4:52 	
 "Mouthful of Sand/The Roadblock" - 5:31 	
 "Snaketrain" - 3:53 	
 "Right Through You" - 3:45 	
 "The Gumbo Man" - 3:34 	
 "Harry Truman" - 3:51 	
 "Venus Is Hell/Overlords" - 5:39 	
 "O.K?/Uba's House of Fashions" - 4:36 	
 "Bad News at the Dynamite Ranch/Beyond Tomorrow" - 7:19

Personnel
Adapted from the Partyball liner notes.
Stan Ridgway - vocals, guitar, keyboards, harmonica, backing vocals 
Mark Schulz - guitar
Joe Ramirez - bass guitar
Bernard Sauser-Hall, Pietra Wexstun - keyboards
Joseph Berardi - drums
Beth Anderson, Evon Williams, John Batdorf, Larry Grennan - background vocals
Elmo Smith - saxophone
Don Teshner - steel guitar on "Snaketrain"
David Sutton - bass guitar on "Right Through You"
Jeff Boynton - piano on "Right Through You"

Chart positions

Singles

References

1991 albums
Stan Ridgway albums
Geffen Records albums